The Almost Man is a 2012 Norwegian comedy film directed by Martin Lund. The film won the 2012 Crystal Globe at the 47th Karlovy Vary International Film Festival, where Henrik Rafaelsen also won the Best Actor award for his role in the film.

References

External links 

2012 comedy films
2012 films
Norwegian comedy films
2010s Norwegian-language films